The Non-Partisan Landless Farmers (BB), officially the Group of Latvian Non-Partisan Landless and Small Farmers (Latvijas bezpartejisko bezzemnieku un mazsaimnieku grupa), was a political party in Latvia in the early 1920s.

History
The party won two seats in the 1920 Constitutional Assembly elections. However, it did not contest any further elections.

References

Defunct political parties in Latvia